John Pickens Dornan (August 11, 1880 – December 23, 1959) was an American cricketer. He played one first-class match for a combined Canada/USA team, against Australia in Manheim, Pennsylvania in 1913, scoring 21 runs in the match.

References
 Cricket Archive profile
 Cricinfo profile

1880 births
1959 deaths
American cricketers
Cricketers from Philadelphia
Wicket-keepers